Veselica is a surname. Notable people with the surname include:

Bruno Veselica (1936–2018), Croatian footballer
Marko Veselica (1936–2017), Croatian politician and economist
Vladimir Veselica (1938–2013), Croatian politician and economist

Croatian surnames